is a Japanese professional shogi player ranked 8-dan.

Early life
Kamiya was born in Hamamatsu, Shizuoka Prefecture on April 21, 1961. He entered the Japan Shogi Association's apprentice school at the rank of 5-kyū in 1975 as student of shogi professional . He obtained full professional status and the rank of 4-dan in March 1981.

Shogi professional
Kamiya is a member of the so-called Shōwa 55 group (55年組), a group of eight strong players that become professional in 1980–1981 (Year 55 of the Shōwa period) and won numerous shogi tournaments.

In 1987, Kamiya won twenty-eight consecutive games to set a new professional shogi record for consecutive victories. Kamiya's record stood until June 2017 when it was broken by Sota Fujii.

Promotion history
The promotion history for Kamiya is as follows:
 5-kyū: 1975
 1-dan: 1978
 4-dan: March 18, 1981
 5-dan: April 1, 1984
 6-dan: March 17, 1989
 7-dan: December 12, 1997
 8-dan: May 1, 2014

Awards and honors
Kamiya received the Japan Shogi Association's Annual Shogi Award for "Most Consecutive Games Won" in 1987. He received the JSA's "25 Years Service Award" 2005 in honor of his being an active shogi professional for twenty-five years.

References

External links
ShogiHub: Professional Player Info · Kamiya, Hiroshi

1961 births
Japanese shogi players
Living people
Professional shogi players
People from Hamamatsu
Professional shogi players from Shizuoka Prefecture